Javier Márquez Gómez (born January 30, 1992), better known by his ring name Dulce Gardenia, is a Mexican luchador (or professional wrestler). He is currently working for Consejo Mundial de Lucha Libre (CMLL), as a técnico ("Good guy") wrestling character. As Gardenia, Márquez portrays an exótico character, who is presented as effeminate and homosexual in the ring. His ring name is in part an homage to Dizzy Gardenia, who was one of the earliest exótico wrestlers in the 1940s.

Professional wrestling career
Márquez initially trained under Kaín in Torreón, Coahuila, making his in-ring debut in 2013. He took the ring name "Dulce Gardenia" ("Sweet Gardenia") in part as a tribute to Dizzy Gardenia (real name Sterling Davis), one of the original exótico characters in the 1940s. He kept training while gaining in-ring experience as well, learning from Águila Roja, Cóndor de Oro and Gran Markus and Halcón Suriano. He later met Último Guerrero, who felt that Márquez was wasting his time working locally in Torreón and invited him to Mexico City, to train at Consejo Mundial de Lucha Libre's (CMLL; "World Wrestling Council") wrestling school.

Márquez was scheduled to wrestle Silver King during a tour of the United Kingdom, under the ring name "Charro del Mysterio", but missed the flight due to issues with his visa documentation, and ended up missing the UK tour where Silver King would die during a match.

Consejo Mundial de Lucha Libre (2019–present)
Gardenia made his CMLL in-ring on June 25, 2019 as he teamed up with Drone and Fuego to defeat the trio of Misterioso Jr., Pólvora and Virus. Shortly after he was introduced to CMLL's TV audience as he made a highly publized debut on CMLL's main show, Super Viernes, winning a singles match over Disturbio that was presented as part of CMLL's LBGT+ celebration and with an in-ring endorsement by Sofia Alonso, the daughter of CMLL owner Paco Alonso.

For CMLL's 86th Anniversary Show, Gardenia's first major show appearance, he, Diamante Azul, and Titán defeated El Hijo del Villano III, Hechicero, and Rey Bucanero by disqualification in the second match of the night of CMLL's biggest annual show. Gardenia participated in his first major CMLL tournament in October as he was teamed up with Volador Jr. for the Gran Alternativa tournament. For the annual Gran Alternativa tournament CMLL teams up a rookie with an established CMLL veteran for a tag team tournament to help elevate the ranking of one or more of the rookie competitors. Gardenia and Volador Jr. defeated Espíritu Negro and Mr. Niebla in the first round, followed by a win over El Coyote and El Terrible, before the team lost to Fugaz and Místico in the semi-finals of the tournament.

Starting in late October, Dulce Gardenia became involved in a storyline feud with Kawato-San, with the two facing off in six-man tag team matches throughout November and December. Kawato and Gardenia both agreed to "bet" their hair in a lucha de apuestas match, which would become the main event of the 2020 Sin Piedad. On January 1, 2020, Gardenia defeated Kawato-San two falls to one, forcing Kawato-San to shave his hair. Later the same month, Gardenia was part of New Japan Pro-Wrestling's Fantastica Mania tour.

Personal life
Márquez is a single father of three, living in Torreón.

Championships and accomplishments
Consejo Mundial de Lucha Libre
Mexican National Trios Championship (1 time, current) – with Espíritu Negro and Rey Cometa

Luchas de Apuestas record

References

1992 births
Exóticos
Living people
Mexican male professional wrestlers
Professional wrestlers from Coahuila
People from Torreón
21st-century LGBT people
21st-century professional wrestlers
Mexican National Trios Champions